Francesc Arroyo is a Spanish writer. He was born in Barcelona in 1950. He studied information science, philosophy and letters at the Universidad de Barcelona. He began his career as a journalist for El País, eventually running its cultural supplement. He then worked for the magazines El Viejo Topo and El Papus. He returned to El País as editor —where he also published a blog— and also taught at his alma mater.

He is known for his books La tesis once and La funesta manía.

References

Spanish writers
1950 births
Living people
People from Barcelona